Pieter Gerkens (born 13 August 1995) is a Belgian footballer who plays as a defensive midfielder for Belgian club Antwerp.

Career 
Gerkens made his professional debut for K.R.C. Genk at 28 November 2013 in a UEFA Europa League game against FC Dynamo Kyiv as an 88th-minute substitute. At 1 December 2013, he made his league debut against Oud-Heverlee Leuven. Three days later he was a starter in the Belgian Cup against KV Mechelen. After 61 minutes he was replaced for Anthony Limbombe.

References

External links
 
 
 

1995 births
Living people
Belgian footballers
Belgium under-21 international footballers
Belgium youth international footballers
K.R.C. Genk players
Sint-Truidense V.V. players
R.S.C. Anderlecht players
Royal Antwerp F.C. players
Belgian Pro League players
Association football midfielders
People from Bilzen
Footballers from Limburg (Belgium)